Steven Mark Zelich (born October 29, 1961) is an American convicted murderer and former police officer for West Allis, Wisconsin who was dubbed the "Wisconsin Suitcase Murderer" by the press. Zelich lured his two victims through sadomasochism websites, committing one murder in Wisconsin and one in Minnesota between 2012 and 2013. He is known for his dumping of the victims' bodies in suitcases on a roadway in Wisconsin. He pleaded guilty to all charges and was sentenced to de facto life in prison in 2017.

Murders 
Zelich frequented S&M websites under the alias “mrhandcuffs”, where he searched for submissive sex slave partners. He met his two victims, 19-year-old Jenny Gamez and 37-year-old Laura Simonson through the sites. Gamez was killed in Wisconsin in August 2012 and Simonson was killed in Minnesota on November 2013. Zelich claimed both died accidentally during sex. He admitted that after causing their deaths, he put their bodies into suitcases and hid them in his home. The suitcases were later put into the trunk of his vehicle, and then dumped along a Geneva, Wisconsin roadway in tall grass. On June 5, 2014, a highway worker discovered the pair of discarded suitcases.

According to the subsequent criminal complaint, the more decomposed of the two bodies was partly concealed in black plastic garbage bags and had her hands bound behind her back with rope. The other body “was found with a rope wrapped around her neck, had a sexual ball gag strapped into her mouth with a collar and was naked.” 

Zelich, who had continued to use S&M dating websites after the recovery of the bodies, was arrested on June 27, 2014.

Investigation and legal proceedings 
Laura Simonson was immediately identified from her dental records. Jenny Gamez was initially unable to be identified, and labeled a Jane Doe. Gamez was last seen by her family in Cottage Grove, Oregon in 2012 at which time she said she would be moving, and had not been reported missing. Walworth County released a composite sketch of Gamez, which led friends and family to identify her. The identification of Jenny Gamez was confirmed by dental records on June 28th, 2014. On June 25, 2014, Zelich was charged with two counts of hiding a corpse and given a million dollar bail. He was later charged with murder.

Guilty plea and sentencing 
Zelich pleaded guilty to first-degree reckless homicide for the killing of Jenny Gamez in early 2016, and was sentenced to 35 years imprisonment. In February 2017, he was sentenced to 25 years for second-degree murder for the murder of Laura Simonson. Zelich received another 10 years for the charges of hiding of corpses in October 2017. Altogether, he was sentenced to 70 years in prison, which is a de facto life sentence since his earliest release date given his multiple sentences is at a date when it is guaranteed he will be dead.

In the media 
Crime Watch Daily reported on the case with a focus on the Walworth County police’s identification process of Jenny Gamez through forensic science.

Notes

References 

1961 births
Living people
2012 murders in the United States
2013 murders in the United States
21st-century American criminals
American male criminals
American police officers convicted of murder
Criminals from Wisconsin
People from Milwaukee
Violence against women in the United States
People convicted of murder by Minnesota
People convicted of murder by Wisconsin